In software engineering, a WAR file (Web Application Resource or Web application ARchive) is a file used to distribute a collection of  JAR-files, JavaServer Pages, Java Servlets, Java classes, XML files, tag libraries, static web pages (HTML and related files) and other resources that together constitute a web application.

Content and structure
A WAR file may be digitally signed in the same way as a JAR file in order to allow others to determine where the source code came from.

There are special files and directories within a WAR file:

 The /WEB-INF directory in the WAR file contains a file named web.xml which defines the structure of the web application. If the web application is only serving JSP files, the web.xml file is not strictly necessary. If the web application uses servlets, then the servlet container uses web.xml to ascertain to which servlet a URL request will be routed. The web.xml file is also used to define context variables which can be referenced within the servlets and it is used to define environmental dependencies which the deployer is expected to set up. An example of this is a dependency on a mail session used to send email. The servlet container is responsible for providing this service.

Advantages of WAR files 
 Easy testing and deployment of web applications
 Easy identification of the version of the deployed application
 All Java EE containers support WAR files
 MVC structure supports WAR files.

Assuming production environments do not promote a fix without sufficient testing prior to deployment, a WAR file has a distinct advantage when properties files are used to identify environment specific variables.  For example, an LDAP server in a testing environment may be something like ldaps://testauth.example.com:636.  The LDAP server in a production environment is ldaps://auth.example.com:636.  An external properties file would define the link with some thing like:

 LINKED_PAGE=ldaps://testauth.example.com:636

The source code reads the property file to determine the target LDAP server.  In this way, developers can be certain that the WAR file tested and verified is exactly the same as that which is being promoted to production.

Disadvantages of WAR files 
Some consider web deployment using WAR files to be disadvantageous when minor changes to source code are required for dynamic environments.  Each change to source code must be repackaged and deployed in development.  This does not require stopping the web server if configured for runtime deployment.

Example 
The following sample web.xml file demonstrates the declaration and association of a servlet:

<?xml version="1.0" encoding="UTF-8"?>
<!DOCTYPE web-app
    PUBLIC "-//Sun Microsystems, Inc.//DTD Web Application 2.2//EN"
    "http://java.sun.com/j2ee/dtds/web-app_2_2.dtd">

<web-app>
    <servlet>
        <servlet-name>HelloServlet</servlet-name>
        <servlet-class>mypackage.HelloServlet</servlet-class>
    </servlet>

    <servlet-mapping>
        <servlet-name>HelloServlet</servlet-name>
        <url-pattern>/HelloServlet</url-pattern>
    </servlet-mapping>

    <resource-ref>
        <description>
            Resource reference to a factory for javax.mail.Session
            instances that may be used for sending electronic mail messages,
            preconfigured to connect to the appropriate SMTP server.
        </description>
        <res-ref-name>mail/Session</res-ref-name>
        <res-type>javax.mail.Session</res-type>
        <res-auth>Container</res-auth>
    </resource-ref>
</web-app>

The /WEB-INF/classes directory is on the ClassLoader's classpath. (The classpath consists of a list of locations from which .class files can be loaded and executed by the JVM.) The /WEB-INF/classes directory contains the classes associated with the web application itself.

Any JAR files placed in the /WEB-INF/lib directory will also be placed on the ClassLoader's classpath.

See also 
 EAR (file format)
 JAR (file format)

References

External links 
 Packaging Web Archives (The Jakarta EE 8 Tutorial)
 JSR 154: JavaTM Servlet 2.4 Specification

Archive formats
Java enterprise platform